Intracoastal City is an unincorporated community in Vermilion Parish, Louisiana, United States. It is situated on the west bank of the Vermilion River at its junction with the Gulf Intracoastal Waterway and has various port facilities and some permanent residents.

Intracoastal City is approximately 13 miles (21 km) south of Abbeville, the Vermilion Parish seat. It is part of the Abbeville Micropolitan Statistical Area as well as the Acadiana region of Louisiana.

On September 4, 2011 Tropical Storm Lee made landfall south-west of the area.

On July 13, 2019 Hurricane Barry made landfall in the area.

Culture
Its facilities include heliports, a shrimp docking facility, and dry docks.
As it stands on the coast of the Gulf of Mexico somewhat remote from major settlements, it is often used by the National Hurricane Center as a breakpoint for tropical cyclone warnings and watches which affect the bayous of eastern Louisiana but not the west of the state. It also plays a major part in Louisiana's oil and gas industry by supporting offshore personnel, platforms and drilling rigs.

Climate
The climate in this area is characterized by hot, humid summers and generally mild to cool winters.  According to the Köppen Climate Classification system, Intracoastal City has a humid subtropical climate, abbreviated "Cfa" on climate maps.

References

External links
Intracoastal City - Vermilion Parish Tourist Commission.
Vermillion Parish: Smaller Communities - Vermilion Parish Schools.
 Vermilion Historical Society

Unincorporated communities in Vermilion Parish, Louisiana
Port cities and towns of the United States Gulf Coast
Unincorporated communities in Louisiana
Acadiana
Populated coastal places in Louisiana